I'm Your Fan: The Songs of Leonard Cohen is a tribute album to Leonard Cohen, released in 1991, produced by the French music magazine Les Inrockuptibles. The album features Cohen's songs interpreted by some of the most respected rock acts of the time. Its name is a play on the title of Cohen's album I'm Your Man.

For the album's American release on Atlantic Records, R.E.M.'s rendition of "First We Take Manhattan" and House of Love's "Who by Fire" (the lead tracks on each side of the vinyl and cassette versions) were swapped so that R.E.M., one of the most popular American rock bands of the era, led the album. In all other countries where the album was released, however, the R.E.M. track appears on Side Two. In the United Kingdom, the album was distributed by record label EastWest Records, in France by Sony Music.

The album includes two different covers of "Tower of Song", one by Robert Forster and another by Nick Cave and the Bad Seeds. The latter version is a radical deconstruction of the song, edited from an hour-long jam session held by the band.

Track listing

Main release
"First We Take Manhattan" – R.E.M.
"Hey, That's No Way to Say Goodbye" – Ian McCulloch
"I Can't Forget" – Pixies
"Stories of the Street" – That Petrol Emotion
"Bird on the Wire" – The Lilac Time
"Suzanne" – Geoffrey Oryema
"So Long, Marianne" – James
"Avalanche IV" – Jean-Louis Murat
"Don't Go Home with Your Hard-On" – David McComb & Adam Peters
"Who by Fire" – The House of Love
"Chelsea Hotel" – Lloyd Cole
"Tower of Song" – Robert Forster
"Take This Longing" – Peter Astor
"True Love Leaves No Traces" – Dead Famous People
"I'm Your Man" – Bill Pritchard
"A Singer Must Die" – The Fatima Mansions
"Tower of Song" – Nick Cave and the Bad Seeds
"Hallelujah" – John Cale

"More Fans"
"The Queen and Me" – John Cale
"There is a War" – Ian McCulloch
"Suzanne" (instrumental) – Geoffrey Oryema
"Paperthin Hotel" – The Fatima Mansions

Notes
All songs written by Leonard Cohen with the exceptions of "Don't Go Home with Your Hard-On" and "True Love Leaves No Traces", both  cowritten by Phil Spector. 
"More Fans", a free promotional bonus CD, was released in France  by FNAC along with the main album. On "More Fans", the John Cale track "The Queen and Me" covers the Cohen track "Queen Victoria" found on Cohen's album Live Songs.

References

Leonard Cohen tribute albums
1991 compilation albums
Folk rock compilation albums